"She Thinks She Needs Me" is a song written by Shane Minor, Sonny LeMaire and Clay Mills, and recorded by American country music artist Andy Griggs.  It was released in February 2004 as the lead-off single from his album This I Gotta See.  It peaked at No. 5 on the Billboard Hot Country Singles & Tracks chart.

Chart performance
The song debuted at number 60 on the Hot Country Songs chart dated February 28, 2004. Having charted for 33 weeks on that chart, it peaked at number 5 on the country chart dated September 11, 2004. It also peaked at number 43 on the Billboard Hot 100.

Year-end charts

References

2004 singles
Andy Griggs songs
Songs written by Shane Minor
Songs written by Clay Mills
RCA Records Nashville singles
2004 songs
Songs written by Sonny LeMaire